Waheed Mohammed Taher (born October 11, 1982) is Qatari footballer who is a defensive midfielder . He is a member of the Qatar national football team.

References

External links
FIFA.com profile
Goalzz.com profile

1982 births
Living people
Qatari footballers
Qatar international footballers
Al-Sailiya SC players
Al Ahli SC (Doha) players
Al-Rayyan SC players
Al-Wakrah SC players
Qatar Stars League players
Qatari Second Division players
Association football midfielders